The Johns Valley Formation is a geologic formation in Arkansas and  Oklahoma.  It preserves fossils dating back to the Carboniferous period.

Paleofauna

Bryozoans

Acanthocladia
A. ouachitensis
Fenestella
F. bendensis
F. grandis
F. granularis
F. kosomensis
F. mimica
F. oklahomensis

Leioclema
L. pushmatahensis
Rhombopora
R. johnsvalleyensis
R. nitidula
Sulcoretepora
S. elegans

Cephalopods

 Bactrites 
 Cravenoceras
 C. scotti 
 Cyclocerid 
 Dentoceras
 D. belemnitiforme 
 Eumorphoceras
 E. plummeri 
 Gastrioceras
 G. adaense 
 G. fittsi 

 Girtyoceras
 G. limatum 
 Glaphyrites
 G. oblatus 
 G. morrowensis 
 Goniatites
 G. choctawensis 
 G. granosus 
 Homoceratoides
 H. cracens 
 Mariceras 

 Metacoceras 
 Mitorthoceras
 M. perfilosum 
 Mooreoceras
 M. normale 
 Neoglyphioceras
 N. cloudi 
 Orthoceracone 
 Paracravenoceras
 P. ozarkense 
 Paradimorphoceras 

 Pseudoparalegoceras
 P. kesslerense 
 Pseudothoceras
 P. knoxense 
 Rayonnoceras
 R. vaughanianum 
 Stenopronorites
 S. arkansiensis

See also

 List of fossiliferous stratigraphic units in Arkansas
 List of fossiliferous stratigraphic units in Oklahoma
 Paleontology in Arkansas
 Paleontology in Oklahoma

References

 

Carboniferous Arkansas
Carboniferous geology of Oklahoma
Carboniferous southern paleotropical deposits